David MacIntyre may refer to:

 David Lowe MacIntyre (1895–1967), Scottish recipient of the Victoria Cross
 David MacIntyre (composer) (born 1952), Canadian composer